Kay Tejan (born 3 February 1997) is a Dutch professional footballer who plays as a striker for Eerste Divisie club TOP Oss.

Career

Volendam
Tejan played in the youth departments of DWS and AFC, after which he moved to FC Volendam in 2016. There, he played two seasons in the second team, Jong FC Volendam, competing in the Derde Divisie. On 2 February 2018, he made his professional debut in the first team of Volendam in a 2–0 home win over Fortuna Sittard, coming on as a late substitute for Luís Pedro. Two months later, he played his second and last game for Volendam, a 4–1 win over Jong AZ where he also appeared as a substitute.

Quick Boys and Kozakken Boys
In 2018, Tejan signed with Quick Boys, where he grew into a proven goal scorer, netting nineteen times during the 2018–19 season in the Derde Divisie. After the season, he moved to Kozakken Boys competing in the Tweede Divisie, where he scored eight goals through two seasons.

TOP Oss
On 23 January 2021, Quick Boys announced that Tejan would return to the club from the start of the 2021–22 season. Before he could make an official appearance for the club however, he signed with Eerste Divisie club TOP Oss, penning a contract on 1 August 2021 after a successful trial.

Tejan joined Moldovan Super Liga club Sheriff Tiraspol on 19 July 2022. He made his competitive debut for the club the same day, coming off the bench in the second half of the UEFA Champions League qualifier against Maribor for Momo Yansané. The transfer was a loan until 31 December 2022, with an option to buy. He scored his first goal for the club on 21 August in a 3–0 away win in the league over CSF Bălți, exploiting an error by opposing goalkeeper Victor Străistari. Tejan returned to TOP on 1 January 2023.

Career statistics

References

External links
 Kay Tejan at Sheriff Tiraspol

1997 births
Living people
Footballers from Amsterdam
Dutch footballers
Dutch expatriate footballers
Association football forwards
AFC DWS players
Amsterdamsche FC players
FC Volendam players
Quick Boys players
Kozakken Boys players
TOP Oss players
FC Sheriff Tiraspol players
Eerste Divisie players
Tweede Divisie players
Derde Divisie players
Moldovan Super Liga players
Expatriate footballers in Moldova
Dutch expatriate sportspeople in Moldova